Jakub Łucak (born 18 September 1989) is a Polish retired handball player who played for the Polish national team.

References

1989 births
Living people
Polish male handball players
Place of birth missing (living people)